Soda Zhemu (born 4 June 1974) is a Zimbabwean politician, member of parliament and cabinet minister. Zhemu is a member of the ruling Zanu-PF party and represents the constituency of Muzarabani North.

In August 2020, Zhemu was appointed as the Minister of Energy and Power Development, replacing Fortune Chasi who was fired by President Emmerson Mnangagwa for conduct that "had become incompatible with the President’s expectations."

Education

Zhemu attended Muzarabani Primary and Secondary Schools as well as Machaya Secondary School.

The Minister attained a BCOM degree in accounting from the Zimbabwe Open University.  According to the Parliament of Zimbabwe website, Zhemu has a Masters in Business Administration (MBA) although the website does not specify the institution which awarded Zhemu the qualification.

References 

1974 births
Living people
Members of the National Assembly of Zimbabwe
ZANU–PF politicians
Government ministers of Zimbabwe
Energy ministers